The Twilight Zone is an American anthology television series developed by Simon Kinberg, Jordan Peele, and Marco Ramirez, based on the original 1959 television series created by Rod Serling. Peele serves as narrator, in addition to executive producing through Monkeypaw Productions. The weekly series premiered on April 1, 2019, on CBS All Access, and was renewed for a second season halfway through its first set of 10 episodes. The second season was released in its entirety on June 25, 2020. In February 2021, the producers announced the series would not return for additional seasons.

Production

Background 
As in the original series, each episode in this incarnation of The Twilight Zone deals with a different topic, addressing such subjects as supernatural occurrences, racism, social issues, misinformation in the press, alien invasions, and immigration, with an unusual and an unexpected twist in each program. Notable episodes include Sanaa Lathan as a woman who discovers that her camcorder can turn back time, Chris O'Dowd as an anthropologist who studies a strange gun, Morena Baccarin as a hotel manager who finds everyone around her standing still, and Damon Wayans Jr. as a church handyman who finds that he can change his town by manipulating a smaller model of it. John Larroquette, Donna Dixon, Eric Keenleyside, Kristin Lehman, Ryan Robbins, Peter Kelamis, Ethan Embry, Gil Bellows, and George Takei also worked in these two  seasons of the Twilight Zone.

In addition to increasing the altitude, "Nightmare at 30,000 Feet" follows a path that is different from that of the iconic 1963 episode starring William Shatner, "Nightmare at 20,000 Feet". The 2019 episode "You Might Also Like" is connected with the classic episode "To Serve Man".  "Blurryman" is a metafictional episode in which  Mark Silverman reprises his impersonation of Rod Serling from The Twilight Zone Tower of Terror Disney attraction. Previous Twilight Zone series had episodes with metafictional elements, notably the original series episode "A World of His Own", where the main character interacts with Serling, and the 1980s revival series episode "Personal Demons", in which Martin Balsam portrays a fictional version of the episode's writer.

Development
In December 2012, it was announced that Bryan Singer had finalized a deal to develop, executive produce, and potentially direct a third revival of The Twilight Zone for CBS Television Studios. At the time of the announcement, the production had yet to hire a writer, begun being shopped to networks and was still finalizing a deal with the Serling estate. On March 7, 2013, it was reported that a writer was in negotiations to join the series. By 2016, Simon Kinberg and Craig Sweeny had joined the production and CBS was weighing whether to shop the project to other networks or streaming services or to place it on their own CBS All Access. Kinberg eventually left the project to write and direct the film Dark Phoenix and Singer and Sweeny soon dropped out as well.

On November 2, 2017, it was announced that CBS was redeveloping the revival for their streaming service CBS All Access. Additionally, it was reported that Jordan Peele was in talks to executive produce the series through his production company Monkeypaw Productions and that Marco Ramirez was in talks to serve as showrunner. On December 6, 2017, it was announced that CBS had given the production a series order. Peele and Ramirez were confirmed to executive produce alongside Simon Kinberg, Win Rosenfeld, Audrey Chon, Carolyn Serling, and Rick Berg. Peele, Ramirez, and Kinberg were also set to collaborate on the series' premiere episode. Production companies involved with the series were slated to consist of CBS Television Studios, Monkeypaw Productions, and Genre Films.

On August 6, 2018, it was confirmed that the first season would consist of ten episodes. Additionally, it was reported that the production had established a writers' room and completed concepts, outlines, and scripts for the first season in various stages of development. The series was not planned to have a formal showrunner but director Greg Yaitanes was set to be in charge of overseeing continuity among episodes. On September 20, 2018, it was announced that, in addition to executive producing, Peele would serve as the series' narrator and host. On October 2, 2018, it was announced via a promotional video for the series that Gerard McMurray was directing an episode with Mathias Herndl serving as his director of photography. On November 15, 2018, it was reported that Alex Rubens would write an episode of the series.

On April 29, 2019, the series was renewed for a second season. In January 2020, CBS All Access revealed episode information on six of the ten episodes of the second season. In May 2020, information on the final four episodes of the season were revealed. On February 24, 2021, CBS All Access announced the series would be ending after two seasons; Peele and Kinberg's companies released a joint statement indicating that although All Access (rebranded as Paramount+) wanted the series to continue, it was "our decision" and that they had "told the stories that we wanted to tell".

Casting
In October 2018, the production company announced that Sanaa Lathan and Adam Scott had been cast in episode-starring roles; Lathan would appear in an episode titled "Rewind" and Scott in an episode titled "Nightmare at 30,000 Feet", a remake of the original series episode "Nightmare at 20,000 Feet". In November, Kumail Nanjiani was announced in an episode-starring role. In December, John Cho, Allison Tolman, Jacob Tremblay, Erica Tremblay, Steven Yeun, and Greg Kinnear were announced: Cho, Tolman, and the Tremblays for roles in an episode titled "The Wunderkind", and Yeun and Kinnear in "The Traveler" (broadcast as "A Traveler"). In January 2019, DeWanda Wise, Jessica Williams, Lucinda Dryzek, Jefferson White, Jonathan Whitesell, Taissa Farmiga, Rhea Seehorn, Luke Kirby, Ike Barinholtz, and Percy Hynes White were announced: Wise, Williams, Dryzek, White, and Whitesell would appear in one episode, while Farmiga, Seehorn, Kirby, Barinholtz, and Hynes-White would be featured in another. In February, Ginnifer Goodwin, James Frain, and Zabryna Guevara were announced as cast for "Point of Origin". The full trailer revealed that Tracy Morgan, Glenn Fleshler and Chris Diamantopoulos would make guest appearances. It was revealed through the official Twitter page that Seth Rogen would appear in an episode. In March, the casting of Zazie Beetz and Betty Gabriel for one episode was announced, while Chris O'Dowd and Amy Landecker would appear in "The Blue Scorpion". Damson Idris was then announced to appear in "Replay", the episode previously titled "Rewind".

In January 2020, several cast members for the second season were announced, which included: Morena Baccarin, Tony Hale, Billy Porter, Christopher Meloni, Joel McHale, Jimmi Simpson and Gillian Jacobs. In May 2020, another round of castings were revealed, which included: Topher Grace, Jurnee Smollett and Damon Wayans Jr.

Filming
Principal photography for season one began on October 1, 2018, in Vancouver, British Columbia, and concluded on March 20, 2019. The producers chose to make the series in color instead of black and white. Executive producer Simon Kinberg stated that the team "wanted to do something to honor the essence and sensibility and style of the original without going so overboard that we were doing a karaoke version of the original." However, the series was also made available to watch in black and white. For the opening sequence, executive producer Simon Kinberg stated that imagery was chosen that reflected the original television series, something used in place of a black-and-white color scheme. Filming for the second season was scheduled to commence from October 6, 2019, to March 16, 2020, in Vancouver.

Episodes

Season 1 (2019)

Season 2 (2020)

Release
On January 30, 2019, it was announced during the Television Critics Association's annual winter press tour that the series would premiere on April 1, 2019. A black-and-white version of the first season was released on May 30, 2019. The second season was released in its entirety on June 25, 2020. In February 2023, the series, among other Paramount+ and Showtime original series was removed from the service.

Marketing
On February 3, 2019, a teaser trailer for the series aired during the telecast of Super Bowl LIII. The commercial played as though it was interrupting CBS' feed of the game and it featured host Jordan Peele standing in an empty Mercedes-Benz Stadium. Another trailer was released on February 21.

Reception

Critical response

Season 1
On the review aggregator Rotten Tomatoes, the first season holds an approval rating of 70% based on 88 reviews, with an average rating of 7.39/10. The website's critical consensus reads, "The Twilight Zone explores the strangeness of the modern world through Rod Serling's winning formula, creating a thought-provoking—if not always spine-tingling—showcase for Jordan Peele and his exceptional crop of collaborators." Metacritic assigned the first season a weighted average score of 60 out of 100 based on 37 critics, indicating "mixed or average reviews".

The BBC gave it a positive review and said: "It's possible that ... Rod Serling and Jordan Peele switched places. As co-creator and on-screen host of the new version, he [Peele] updates the series while capturing the original's essence." The Week was more mixed in its review, calling the first episodes "unforgivably long", but also saying that the series stays "true to the ethos of The Twilight Zone" and that "the episodes are free-standing and timeless". The Verge also gave it a mixed review, praising Peele as the narrator, but saying the series should try to step away from the original. The Atlantic was more critical, comparing it to the original series, stating, "[w]ith the exception of one superior episode, 'Replay', it's hard to conceive that an artist as prodigiously talented and thoughtful as Peele is creatively involved at all."

Season 2
The second season—based on three episodes sent to critics ("Meet in the Middle", "The Who of You" and "You Might Also Like")—has received mixed reviews from critics. On Rotten Tomatoes, the second season holds an approval rating of 63% based on 24 reviews, with an average rating of 6.39/10. The website's critical consensus reads, "The Twilight Zone sophomore season shines when it dares to be bold, but long runtimes and predictable plotting hold it back from reaching its full potential." Metacritic assigned the second season a weighted average score of 57 out of 100 based on 10 critics, indicating "mixed or average reviews".

Kristen Lopez of IndieWire gave the three episodes a collective grade of "B−" and wrote, "These episodes certainly feel more strongly written than Season 1, and if the editing tightens up like it did before, these new entries could be amazing. It'll be hard for any other episode to be better than 'You Might Also Like', though, which is a pure masterpiece." Brian Tallerico of RogerEbert.com wrote that "every episode in this trio disappoints to varying degrees".

Accolades
At the 71st Primetime Emmy Awards, Kumail Nanjiani received a nomination for Outstanding Guest Actor in a Drama Series for "The Comedian", the first episode of season one.

References

External links

 
 

The Twilight Zone
2010s American anthology television series
2010s American drama television series
2010s American horror television series
2010s American LGBT-related drama television series
2010s American science fiction television series
2019 American television series debuts
2020 American television series endings
2020s American anthology television series
2020s American drama television series
2020s American horror television series
2020s American LGBT-related drama television series
2020s American science fiction television series
American fantasy television series
American horror fiction television series
Paramount+ original programming
English-language television shows
Metafictional television series
Science fiction anthology television series
Television series by CBS Studios
Television series created by Jordan Peele
Television series created by Simon Kinberg
Television series reboots
Television shows filmed in Vancouver